Louis Charles de Montigny (1805–1868) was a French diplomat who was active in Asia during the 19th century.

Biography
He was the first French consul in Shanghai from 23 January 1848 to 10 June 1853. He founded the Shanghai French Concession in 1849.

In 1856, de Montigny was sent as a French envoy to King Mongkut of Thailand. A treaty was signed on 15 August 1856 to facilitate trade, guarantee religious freedom, and allow the access of French warships to Bangkok.

From Thailand, de  Montigny visited Vietnam in 1857 to demand the establishment of a consulate in Huế, freedom to trade and to preach, and an end to persecution against Catholics. However, the Vietnamese court  rejected all of his demands.  When Montigny's mission failed, Napoléon III decided to dispatch a military force of 3,000 to Vietnam, leading to the capture of Da Nang by Charles Rigault de Genouilly on 1 September 1858.

Charles de Montigny served again as President of the Municipal Council in Shanghai from 1 May 1862. From 1863 to 1868, he was French Consul in Tientsin, where he died in 1868.

Notes

1805 births
1868 deaths
People of the Cochinchina campaign
19th-century French diplomats